The Guards Museum is a military museum in Central London, England. It is in Wellington Barracks on Birdcage Walk near Buckingham Palace, which is the home of the five regiments of Foot Guards (the Grenadier Guards, Coldstream Guards, Scots Guards, Irish Guards, and Welsh Guards).

History
The museum opened in 1988. It tells the story of the regiments it represents, from the 17th century to the present day. The displays include many examples of different Guards uniforms, chronicling the evolving dress over time of the five regiments. There are also paintings, weapons, models, sculptures, and artefacts such as Mess Silver – all of which are aimed at explaining to the visitor the history of the regiments and what being a soldier in the Guards is all about.

References

External links
 The Guards Museum official website
 

1988 establishments in the United Kingdom
Guards Division (United Kingdom)
Museums established in 1988
Museums in the City of Westminster
Regimental museums in London
Military and war museums in London